The 1969 Boston Patriots season was the franchise's 10th and final season in the American Football League. The Patriots ended the season with a record of four wins and ten losses, and finished tied for third in the AFL's Eastern Division.

Offseason

NFL Draft

Staff

Roster

Schedule

Standings

Season schedule

References

Boston Patriots
New England Patriots seasons
Boston Patriots
1960s in Boston